is Cute's sixth studio album, released on April 6, 2011, in Japan on the record label Zetima.

The album release was delayed due to the 2011 Tohoku earthquake and tsunami.

The album debuted at number 20 in the Oricon Weekly Albums Chart, remaining in the chart for three weeks.

Track listing

Charts

References

External links 
  
  

2011 albums
Cute (Japanese idol group) albums
Zetima albums